Lee Drutman is an American political scientist. He is a senior fellow at the New America Foundation. He is known as an advocate for proportional representation with ranked-choice voting in the U.S. political system, arguing that it would reduce political polarization and minimize the risks of democratic backsliding.

Life 
He has a PhD from the University of California, Berkeley, and a BA from Brown University. He received the 2016 American Political Science Association's Robert A. Dahl Award for "scholarship of the highest quality on the subject of democracy".

He has advanced his arguments in favor of proportional voting in Breaking the Two-Party Doom Loop: The Case for Multiparty Democracy in America. In 2021, Washingtonian magazine listed him as one of the most influential people of Washington D.C., citing his advocacy for proportional voting. He is a regular contributor to FiveThirtyEight, where he writes on current affairs. His work appeared in Noema, and Foreign Policy.

Bibliography 

 The Business of America Is Lobbying, Oxford University Press, 2015 .
 Two-Party Doom Loop: The Case for Multiparty Democracy in America,  Oxford University Press, 2020.

References

Living people
Year of birth missing (living people)
American political scientists
Brown University alumni
University of California, Berkeley alumni